Billy the Artist (BTA), real name William Miller, was an East Village-based artist whose rise to prominence came when he created the ceiling murals for RENT. He also was the artist behind Moo York Celebration, one of the cows behind the Cow Parade public art project and subsequently created cows for other cities' projects. The East Village was a longtime canvas of his.

BTA was one of the first American artists to be allowed to paint on The Bund in Shanghai.

Miller died of cancer on January 22, 2022.

References

External links

20th-century births
2022 deaths
Artists from New York City
East Village, Manhattan
Year of birth missing